Tiger Love is an Israeli synth pop duo which was established in the early 2010s by brothers Roy Ben Artzi and Gigi Ben Artzi. The band gained popularity and shared a stage with artists such as The Pet Shop Boys and Mark Ronson and Arctic Monkeys. In a 2011 interview the band, which was based in London at the time, stated that they were from London and New York.

History

"Tiger Love" was established in the early 2010s by brothers Roy Ben Artzi and Gigi Ben Artzi. Gigi played bass, while his brother Roy played guitar and was the lead vocalist. The band's song "Pussy Cocaine" released in 2010 reportedly received hundreds of thousands of views and even made it to the top ten of the Hype Machine Music Chart. They have shared a stage with artists such as The Pet Shop Boys and Mark Ronson and were featured in The Guardian, Paper magazine and Fred Perry.

In 2011, "Tiger Love" appeared at the Lowlands Music Festival in the Netherlands with The Arctic Monkeys.

In 2016, they released their single "Space in Space". In the track's accompanying video, which was directed by both brothers, model and Instagram sensation Aliyah Galyautdinova is seen sexually pleasuring herself.

Discography

Singles
"Pussy Cocaine" (2010)
"Summer Rain" (2012)
"Space in Space" (2016)
"See Smoke Sun" (2017)

References

External links
 

Musical groups from Tel Aviv